Roqué Marrapodi (18 June 1919 – 14 June 1994) was an Argentine footballer. He played in two matches for the Argentina national football team in 1954. He was also part of Argentina's squad for the 1955 South American Championship.

References

External links
 

1919 births
1994 deaths
Argentine footballers
Argentina international footballers
Association football goalkeepers
Sportspeople from Buenos Aires Province
Ferro Carril Oeste footballers
Club Atlético Vélez Sarsfield footballers
Club Atlético Temperley footballers
Arsenal de Sarandí footballers